Illuminatus may refer to:

singular of Illuminati
Illuminatus of Arce (fl. 1219), companion of Saint Francis
Illuminatus of Assisi (d. c. 1281), bishop
The Illuminatus! Trilogy (1975), a series of novels by Robert Shea and Robert Anton Wilson
Illuminatus (band), an alternative metal band from Nottingham
Illuminatus (video game), a computer game originating from an April fool's joke
Illuminatus, a 1995 album by Green Magnet School